Kristian Asmussen (born 16 April 1971) is a Danish handballer, currently the goalkeeper of Danish Handball League side KIF Kolding København. He has previously played for the Spanish club BM Altea and OV Helsingborg HK.

Asmussen has played 74 matches for the Danish national handball team.

External links
 player info

1971 births
Living people
Danish male handball players